Kajarhawa  is a village in Kapilvastu District in the Lumbini Province of southern Nepal. At the time of the 2001 Nepal census it had a population of 3438 people living in 571 individual households.

Formerly, Kajarhawa was a village development committee (VDC), which were local-level administrative units. In 2017, the government of Nepal restructured local government in line with the 2015 constitution and VDCs were discontinued.

References

Populated places in Kapilvastu District